Hanna Eigel (born 20 May 1939 in Vienna) is an Austrian figure skater. She is the 1955 and 1957 European champion and the 1957 World silver medalist. She represented Austria at the 1956 Winter Olympics, where she was placed 5th.

Competitive highlights

External inkss
 
 
 

Austrian female single skaters
Figure skaters at the 1956 Winter Olympics
Olympic figure skaters of Austria
Figure skaters from Vienna
1939 births
Living people
World Figure Skating Championships medalists
European Figure Skating Championships medalists